The 1975 NCAA Division I basketball tournament involved 32 schools playing in single-elimination play to determine the national champion of men's  NCAA Division I college basketball. It began on March 15, 1975, and ended with the championship game on March 31 at the San Diego Sports Arena, now known as Pechanga Arena San Diego, in San Diego, California. A total of 36 games were played, including a third-place game in each region and a national third-place game.  This was the first 32-team tournament.

UCLA, coached by John Wooden, won his 10th national title and last with a 92–85 victory in the final game over Kentucky, coached by Joe B. Hall. Richard Washington of UCLA was named the tournament's Most Outstanding Player.

The Bruins again had an advantage by playing the Final Four in their home state. It was the last time a team won the national championship playing in its home state.

Tournament notes
The bracket expanded to 32 teams; the previous six editions had 25 teams, and had varied between 22 and 25 from 1953 through 1974.
With the expanded bracket, seven teams made their NCAA tournament debuts: Alabama, Central Michigan, Middle Tennessee, Montana, UNLV, Rutgers, and San Diego State. This was the most new teams since a then-record eleven new teams made the 25-team  bracket in 1956.
Alabama had previously won the Southeastern Conference in 1956, but were deemed ineligible for the tournament due to their entire starting lineup having played as freshmen, which was not allowed at the time. They had also tied Vanderbilt for the 1974 SEC title, but lost the bid because Vanderbilt was ranked higher.
It was the last time until 2021 that Oregon State officially won an NCAA tournament game. (The Beavers won two tournament games in 1982, but those were later vacated by the NCAA.) Of the major conferences, only Nebraska, which has never won an NCAA tournament game, had a longer active winning drought.
This was the last tournament in which third-place games were contested in each regional; the national third-place game continued through 1981.
This was also the first NCAA tournament to allow more than one team per conference; previously, only one team from each conference was allowed. This change was in response to a number of factors:
The USC Trojans were ranked fifth in both major polls in 1971, their only two losses were to Pac-8 rival and top-ranked UCLA (the defending and eventual national champion), but were excluded from the 25-team NCAA tournament due to being runner-up in the conference.
The 1974 ACC tournament final pitted two of the three best teams in the country: North Carolina State and Maryland.
In 1974, the Collegiate Commissioners' Association held a tournament in St. Louis, Missouri. They invited the second-place teams from eight conferences to participate.
The new selection criteria threatened to exclude Northeastern teams, which did not belong to conferences. To address this problem, this was the first NCAA Tournament to grant automatic bids to the winners of ECAC regional tournaments for Northeastern Division I independents organized by the Eastern College Athletic Conference, a loose sports federation of Northeastern colleges and universities; this practice continued through 1982.
Finally, the national final was the last game for UCLA coaching legend John Wooden, who had announced his retirement at the press conference following the Saturday semifinal win over Louisville. Two days later, he won his tenth and final NCAA championship.

Memorable games
There were two memorable games in the 1975 tournament. Number 2 ranked Kentucky upset previously unbeaten Indiana 92–90 in their regional final. The Hoosiers, coached by Bob Knight, were undefeated and the number one team in the nation, when leading scorer Scott May suffered a broken arm in a win over arch-rival Purdue. This was the only loss Indiana would suffer between March 1974 and December 1976. In the national semifinals, UCLA defeated Louisville, coached by former Wooden assistant Denny Crum, 75–74 in overtime,  rallying late in regulation to force overtime and coming from behind in overtime to win on a last second shot by Richard Washington.

Both games made USA Todays list of the greatest NCAA tournament games of all time, with the former at #8 and the latter at #28.

Schedule and venues
The following are the sites that were selected to host each round of the 1975 tournament:First roundMarch 15East Region Charlotte Coliseum, Charlotte, North Carolina
 The Palestra, Philadelphia, PennsylvaniaMideast Region Memorial Coliseum, Lexington, Kentucky
 Memorial Coliseum, Tuscaloosa, AlabamaMidwest Region Lubbock Municipal Coliseum, Lubbock, Texas
 Mabee Center, Tulsa, OklahomaWest Region WSU Performing Arts Coliseum, Pullman, Washington
 ASU Activity Center, Tempe, ArizonaRegional semifinals and finals (Sweet Sixteen and Elite Eight)
March 20 and 22East Regional, Providence Civic Center, Providence, Rhode IslandMideast Regional, University of Dayton Arena, Dayton, OhioMidwest Regional, Pan American Center, Las Cruces, New MexicoWest Regional, Memorial Coliseum, Portland, OregonNational semifinals, 3rd-place game, and championship' (Final Four and championship)
March 29 and 31
San Diego Sports Arena, San Diego, California

Teams

Bracket
* – Denotes overtime period

East region

Mideast region

Midwest region

West region

Final Four

See also
 1975 NCAA Division II basketball tournament
 1975 NCAA Division III basketball tournament
 1975 National Invitation Tournament
 1975 NAIA Division I men's basketball tournament
 1975 National Women's Invitation Tournament

References

NCAA Division I men's basketball tournament
Ncaa
Basketball competitions in Portland, Oregon
NCAA Division I men's basketball tournament, 1975
NCAA Division I men's basketball tournament
NCAA Division I men's basketball tournament
Basketball competitions in Lubbock, Texas
Basketball competitions in California
Basketball in Rhode Island
Sports competitions in Providence, Rhode Island